Şükrü Okan (1880–1957) was a Turkish admiral and politician. He was a devoted supporter of Atatürk and his reforms.

References 

1880 births
1957 deaths
Turkish admirals
People from Tirebolu
Republican People's Party (Turkey) politicians
20th-century Turkish politicians